Guido Andreozzi and Andrés Molteni were the defending champions but only Andreozzi chose to defend his title, partnering Thiago Seyboth Wild. Andreozzi withdrew from the tournament before his quarterfinal match.

Luciano Darderi and Juan Bautista Torres won the title after defeating Hernán Casanova and Santiago Rodríguez Taverna 7–6(7–5), 7–6(12–10) in the final.

Seeds

Draw

References

External links
 Main draw

Challenger de Buenos Aires - Doubles
2021 Doubles